Medicago minima is a plant species of the genus Medicago. It is native to the Mediterranean basin but is found worldwide. It forms a symbiotic relationship with the bacterium Sinorhizobium meliloti, which is capable of nitrogen fixation. Common names include bur medick, little bur-clover, little bur medick, little medick, small medick, and woolly bur medick.

References

External links 
International Legume Database & Information Services

minima
Flora of Lebanon
Flora of Malta